Francesco Comi, also known as il Muto da Verona or il Fornaretto, (Bologna, 1682 - 1 January 1769) was an Italian painter of the Baroque Period. He was a pupil of Giovanni Gioseffo dal Sole. He was deaf and was active mainly in Verona.

References

17th-century Italian painters
Italian male painters
18th-century Italian painters
Painters from Bologna
Italian Baroque painters
1682 births
1769 deaths
Deaf artists
Italian deaf people
18th-century Italian male artists